Laredo–Nuevo Laredo (UN/LOCODE: USLRD & MXNLD) is one of six transborder agglomerations along the U.S.-Mexican border. The city of Laredo is situated in the U.S. state of Texas on the northern bank of the Rio Grande and Nuevo Laredo is located in the Mexican State of Tamaulipas in the southern bank of the river. This area is also known as the Two Laredos or the Laredo Borderplex. The area is made up of one county: Webb County in Texas and three municipalities: Nuevo Laredo Municipality in Tamaulipas, Hidalgo Municipality in Coahuila, Anáhuac Municipality in Nuevo León in Mexico. Two urban areas: the Laredo Metropolitan Statistical Area and the Zona Metropolitana Nuevo Laredo (Nuevo Laredo Metropolitan Zone)  three cities and 12 towns make the Laredo–Nuevo Laredo Metropolitan area which has a total of 636,516 inhabitants according to the INEGI Census of 2010 and the United States Census estimate of 2010. The Laredo–Nuevo Laredo is connected by four International Bridges and an International Railway Bridge. According to World Gazetteer this urban agglomeration ranked 157th largest in North and South America in 2010 with an estimated population of 675,481. This area ranks 66th in the United States and 23rd in Mexico.

Populated Places

Laredo–Nuevo Laredo area is formed by the following populated places:

Urban Areas
Nuevo Laredo: 425,058  
Laredo: 259,151

Cities

Texas
Río Bravo: 5,553
El Cenizo: 3,545

Tamaulipas
Campanario: 4,538

Towns

Texas
Laredo Ranchettes: 1,845
Larga Vista: 742
Penitas West: 520
La Presa: 508

Coahuila
Hidalgo: 1,638

Tamaulipas
Álvarez: 1,257
Nuevo Progreso: 393
América: 263
América II: 253
Los Artistas: 175
Miguel Alemán: 165
La Cruz: 100

Nuevo León
Colombia: 541

History

Villa de San Agustin de Laredo was founded in 1755 by Don Tomas Sanchez while the area was part of a region called Nuevo Santander in the Spanish colony of New Spain. Villa de San Agustin de Laredo got its name from Laredo, Cantabria, Spain and in honor of Saint Augustine of Hippo.  In 1840, Laredo was the capital of the independent Republic of the Rio Grande, set up in rebellion to the dictatorship of Antonio López de Santa Anna and brought back into Mexico by military force. In 1846, during the Mexican–American War the town was occupied by the Texas Rangers. After the war the Treaty of Guadalupe-Hidalgo ceded the land to the United States. A referendum was taken in the town, which voted overwhelmingly to petition the American military government in charge of the area to return the town to Mexico. However, this petition was rejected, and in response the bulk of the population moved over the river into Mexican territory to found the new town of Nuevo Laredo.

The origin of name of Laredo is unclear. Some scholars say the name might stem from Glaretum which means "sandy, rocky place" others state that Laredo stems from Euskara and means "beautiful prairies". Laredo might also stem from Laridae which means gull or it might be made up of two Latin words lar which means home and edo which means birth.

Economy

Trade
More than 47% of United States international trade headed for Mexico and more than 36% of Mexican international trade crosses through the Laredo–Nuevo Laredo port of entries. This is the reason that the borderplex's economy rotates around commercial and industrial warehousing, import, and export. The Laredo International Airport serves the Laredo area which has scheduled nonstop flights to Houston, Dallas, Orlando, and Las Vegas. The city of Nuevo Laredo has the Quetzalcóatl International Airport which has daily flights to Mexico City. These airports also handle merchandise to export to the neighboring country. The Laredo–Nuevo Laredo port of entry has five international bridges crossing the Rio Bravo in 2007.

International Bridges

Gateway to the Americas International Bridge
Juárez-Lincoln International Bridge
World Trade International Bridge (commercial traffic only)
Colombia-Solidarity International Bridge
Texas-Mexican Railway International Bridge

Major highways
Major highways in Laredo and their starting and ending points:
Interstate 35 Laredo–Duluth
U.S. Highway 59 Laredo–Lancaster
U.S. Highway 83 Brownsville–Laredo–Westhope
State Highway 255 Laredo–Colombia
State Highway 359 Laredo–Skidmore
Complete List of Highways in Laredo, Texas

Major highways in Nuevo Laredo and their starting and ending points:
Mexican Federal Highway 85 Nuevo Laredo–Mexico City
Mexican Federal Highway 2 Matamoros–Nuevo Laredo–Colombia–Ciudad Acuña
Tamaulipas State Highway 1 Nuevo Laredo–Monterrey
Nuevo León State Highway Spur 1 Colombia–Anáhuac

Retail Sales

Retail sales also helps the Laredo–Nuevo Laredo economy, it attracts shoppers from Northern Mexico and South Texas. The major mall is Mall del Norte. The Streets of Laredo Urban Mall is an association created by businesses located in Iturbide Street in the San Agustin historical district to beautify and renovate the area.

Media

Newspapers

Television
According to Nielsen Media Research, the Laredo region (which includes Webb and Zapata counties) is ranked 185th market by population size in the United States. The first station to broadcast in Laredo was KGNS in 1956, followed by KVTV in 1973, then KJTB (now KLDO) in 1985.

Notably television networks missing from Laredo's airwaves are PBS and The CW. Laredo once had a full-power local affiliate, KGNS-DT2 until the affiliation switched to ABC. Prior to that KJTB channel 27, was affiliated to ABC from January 1985 to October 1988. KJTB was later bought by Entravision and affiliated the station to Telemundo and changed its callsign to KLDO. Today KLDO is affiliated to Univision. Before KJTB, KGNS, an NBC affiliate had a secondary affiliation to ABC from its founding in 1956 through KJTB's founding in 1985. On November 6, 2013, KGNS reached an agreement with the ABC Television Network to add the ABC affiliation. The launch for the ABC affiliate will be in February 2014 on KGNS's subchannel 8.2 and will carry ABC's entire schedule. It's unknown if Laredo CW 19 would move to either 8.3 or to just disaffiliate with the network entirely.

In December 2014, all Nuevo Laredo stations must discontinue analog television broadcasting and broadcast digitally only.

Television

Radio
According to Arbitron, the Laredo region (which includes Jim Hogg, Webb, and Zapata counties) is ranked 191st market by population size.

AM radio

Long range AM stations
The following Clear Channel AM stations can be heard in Laredo:

FM radio

PR:Suspected pirate radio stations since they are not licensed with Federal Communications Commission (FCC) in the United States or COFETEL in Mexico. Some pirate stations are suspected, due to the fact that other licensed stations nearby share the same frequency, such as 106.5 Radio Voz and KMAE from nearby Bruni, Texas and 103.3 Radio 33 and XHAHU-FM from nearby Anáhuac, Nuevo León, each city less than 50 miles from Laredo.

Sports
Laredo is home to four semiprofessional sports teams. The Laredo Bucks are a Central Hockey League hockey team in the Southern Conference's Southeast Division. The Bucks have been the League's Champion twice in 2003 and 2005. The Laredo Heat is a Premier Development League soccer team in the Southern Conference's Mid South Division. Laredo are the current USL Premier Development League champions, having defeated 2006 champions Michigan Bucks in a penalty shootout, following a 0-0 draw in the 2007 championship game. The Laredo Broncos are a baseball team in the United League. Nuevo Laredo is home to the Mexican Soccer League's Second Division Bravos de Nuevo Laredo. Both Laredo were home to the Tecolotes de los Dos Laredos which were the only Mexican Baseball League team to play in both the United States and Mexico. The Tecolotes de los Dos Laredos were the Mexican Baseball League Champions in 1953, 1954, 1958, 1977, and 1989. In 2008 the Tecolotes came back to Nuevo Laredo and they are known as the Tecolotres de Nuevo Laredo.

Gallery

Pictures of Laredo, Texas

Pictures of Nuevo Laredo, Mexico

See also
San Diego–Tijuana
El Paso-Juárez
Reynosa–McAllen Metropolitan Area
Matamoros–Brownsville Metropolitan Area
List of Texas metropolitan areas
United States metropolitan area
List of United States metropolitan statistical areas by population
Metropolitan areas of Mexico
Transnational conurbations Mexico/USA

References

External links
City of Laredo Official Website
City of Nuevo Laredo Official Website 
City of El Cenizo Official Website
Webb County Official Website

 
Metropolitan areas of Mexico
Metropolitan areas of Texas
Transborder agglomerations